Samuel Steven Willard (born September 9, 1988) is an American former professional basketball player who last played for Toyama Grouses in Japan. He played college basketball for Pacific.

Career statistics 

|-
| align="left" |  2012-13
| align="left" | Sendai
| 50 || 50 || 35.4 || .532 || .250 || .667 || 14.0 || 2.2 || 1.2 || 0.6 ||  10.4
|-
| align="left" |  2013-14
| align="left" | Toyama
| 52 || 52 || 32.7 || .522 || .318 || .708 || 12.5 || 1.7 || 1.0 || 0.7 ||  11.2
|-
| align="left" |  2014-15
| align="left" | Toyama
| 52||52 || 33.3|| .518|| .304|| .741|| 12.0|| 2.4|| 1.4|| 1.0||  13.2
|-
| align="left" |  2015-16
| align="left" | Toyama
|49 || 48||33.3 ||.524 ||.374 ||.682 ||13.1 ||2.4 ||1.0 ||0.9 ||15.4
|-
| align="left" |  2016-17
| align="left" | Toyama
|60 || 54||27.7 ||.505 ||.243 ||.771 ||9.6 ||1.6 ||1.1 ||0.7 ||12.1
|-
| align="left" |  2017-18
| align="left" | Toyama
|58 || 48||24.4 ||.436 ||.345 ||.844 ||8.2 ||2.0 ||0.8 ||0.7 ||10.4
|-

References

External links
Pacific Tigers bio

1988 births
Living people
American expatriate basketball people in Japan
American expatriate basketball people in Latvia
American men's basketball players
Basketball players from Ohio
Basketball players from South Dakota
BK VEF Rīga players
Centers (basketball)
Pacific Tigers men's basketball players
People from Elyria, Ohio
People from Pierre, South Dakota
Power forwards (basketball)
Sendai 89ers players
Toyama Grouses players